The 2014 Men's Hockey Investec Cup was a men's field hockey tournament held at the Lee Valley Hockey and Tennis Centre. It took place between 9–13 July 2014 in London, England. A total of four teams competed for the title.

England won the tournament by defeating Ireland 4–2 in a penalty shoot-out following a 2–2 draw in the final. South Africa won the bronze medal by defeating Scotland 3–0 in the third and fourth playoff.

Participating nations
A total of four teams competed for the title:

Results

Pool matches

Classification matches

Third and fourth place

Final

Statistics

Final standings

Goalscorers
4 Goals
 Ashley Jackson
3 Goals
 Austin Smith
2 Goals

 Alastair Brogdon
 Nicholas Catlin
 Mark Gleghorne
 Simon Mantell
 Barry Middleton
 Henry Weir
 Michael Darling
 Alan Sothern

1 Goal

 David Condon
 Harry Martin
 Phil Roper
 Timothy Cockram
 Ronan Gormley
 Eugene Magee
 Shane O'Donoghue
 Wei Adams
 Kenny Bain
 Dan Coultas
 Jean-Pierre de Voux
 Lance Louw
 Taine Paton
 Wade Paton
 Daniel Sibbald

References

External links

2014 in field hockey
2014 Men's Hockey Investec Cup
field hockey
field hockey
field hockey
field hockey
July 2014 sports events in Europe